Avtandil Kentchadze (born December 22, 1995) is a Georgian wrestler who won a silver medal at the 2018 World Wrestling Championships.  Kentchadze also captured a bronze medal at both the U23 Senior European Championships in 2018 and U23 senior World Champions held in 2017. In March 2021, he competed at the European Qualification Tournament in Budapest, Hungary hoping to qualify for the 2020 Summer Olympics in Tokyo, Japan. He competed in the men's 74 kg event at the 2020 Summer Olympics.

References

External links
 

Male sport wrestlers from Georgia (country)
World Wrestling Championships medalists
1995 births
Living people
Wrestlers at the 2015 European Games
Wrestlers at the 2019 European Games
European Games medalists in wrestling
European Games bronze medalists for Georgia (country)
European Wrestling Championships medalists
Wrestlers at the 2020 Summer Olympics
Olympic wrestlers of Georgia (country)
20th-century people from Georgia (country)
21st-century people from Georgia (country)